Advanced Integrated Manufacturing Corp. Ltd. (AIM Corp) is a Singapore-based Electronic Manufacturing Services (EMS) provider.  The company is listed on the SGX, the Singapore stock exchange.  The company is involved in aerospace, life sciences, telecommunications, fiber optics and other information science manufacturing applications.

References 
AIM Corp corporate profile at AIM Corp

Electronics companies of Singapore
Companies listed on the Singapore Exchange
Singaporean brands